The Bronx School for Law, Government and Justice (LGJ) is a New York City Department of Education public school in the Concourse Village neighborhood of the Bronx, New York City, United States. With the support of the Urban Assembly, it was founded in September 1997 and educates students in grades six through twelve.  The founding principal was David C. Banks. Meisha Ross Porter continued his work until being succeeded by the current principal Johanie Hernandez.  The school is located next to the Bronx Hall of Justice.

Athletics 
Bronx LGJ offers boys baseball (made playoffs five of last six years), basketball (2016/2017 League Champions), track (cross country NYC Championship Qualifiers) and bowling, as well as girls softball, bowling, track and volleyball (2017 League Champions, have made playoffs two years in a row). The indoor track has also made it to the city championships. Recently, the school has started a middle school and high school co-ed soccer team.

The school's colors are blue and white, and its mascot is the Jaguar.

Activities 

LGJ has won mock trial championships and many policy debate awards in the past.  The numerous trophies fill the cases of the vast atrium.  Currently LGJ is focused on its public forum debate team, which is also accumulating many awards.

LGJ's other clubs include the Student Government Association, Step Team, National Honor Society, Hispanic Honor Society, Spanish Club, Gay Straight Student Alliance, Spanish Honors Society, National Honors Society and Step Team.

Academics 
 
A variety of electives revolve around the school's law and justice themes such as Civil Law, Criminal Law, Constitutional Law, Student Court, African American History and Justice and Multicultural History and Justice. Advanced Placement courses include U.S. History, Spanish Literature, English Language, Statistics and Government. Other electives currently include Visual Arts, Technology, Drama and Film and Literature.

Enrolled middle school students are usually guaranteed a seat in the high school.  The vast majority of middle schoolers choose to attend the high school.

External links
 NYC DoE: Bronx School for Law, Government and Justice
 School Website

Public high schools in the Bronx
Educational institutions established in 1997
Public middle schools in the Bronx
Concourse, Bronx
1997 establishments in New York City